Mitrephora fragrans is a species of plant in the family Annonaceae. It is native to Borneo and The Philippines.  Elmer Drew Merrill, the American botanist who first formally described the species, named it after its large, fragrant (fragrans in Latin) flowers.

Description
It is a tree reaching 8 to 10 meters in height.  Its leathery leaves are 10-26 by 5-11 centimeters and have rounded or slightly pointed tips.  Its fragrant flowers are solitary and yellow to orange.  Its sepals are oval to oblong and 10-14 millimeters in length.  Its mature outer petals are 5.5 by 4 centimeters, oblong and come to a point at their tip. The outside surface of the outer petals is hairy.  Its inner petals have purple highlights, are 3 centimeters long and have an arched shape.  The inside surface of the inner petals is hairy.  It has numerous stamens that are 1.5 millimeters long.  Its flowers have up to 10 carpels.  Its carpels have 16-20 ovules.

Reproductive biology
The pollen of M. fragrans is shed as permanent tetrads.

References

Flora of Borneo
Flora of the Philippines
fragrans
Vulnerable plants
Plants described in 1915
Taxonomy articles created by Polbot
Taxa named by Elmer Drew Merrill